Rabat is a town in the Northern Region of Malta, with a population of 11,497 as of March 2014.   It adjoins the ancient capital city of Mdina, and a north-western area formed part of the Roman city of Melite until its medieval retrenchment. The Apostolic Nunciature of the Holy See to the Republic of Malta is seated in this village. The Local Council of Rabat is also the administrator of Baħrija. Parts of the films Munich and Black Eagle were shot in Rabat. In December 1999, Mtarfa was split from Rabat to form a separate Local Council by Act XXI, an amendment to the Local Council Act of 1993 (Act XV).

Etymology
Rabat is a Semitic word which can mean "fortified town" or "suburb".

Catacombs

Rabat is home to the famous Catacombs of St. Paul and of St. Agatha. These catacombs were used in Roman times to bury the dead as, according to Roman culture, it was unhygienic to bury the dead in the city. Mdina and parts of Rabat were built on top of the ancient Roman city of Melite. The Maltese catacombs were never meant to be hiding places during persecutions or as living quarters.

The Catacombs of St. Paul are now looked after by Heritage Malta. Part of St. Paul's Catacombs, the part accessible from the Parish  tradition and as recorded in the Bible, St. Paul stayed for three months when he was shipwrecked on the island in AD 60.

In the Catacombs of St Agatha's, there are over 500 graves of several types, the majority being for children. There are sections for pagans and Jews, as well as for Christians. There are also unique frescoes.

Another interesting feature in the Maltese catacombs is the agape table, two of which, carved out of bedrock, were found in the Catacombs of St. Paul.

Buildings

 St Pauls Collegiate and Grotto
 Nativity of Our Lady church (k.a. Ta’Qasha) in St Rita Street.
 St. Pauls - Count Roger Band Club
 Archbishop Seminary
 Augustinian Priory
 Annunciation Church (Carmelite Fathers) 
Casa Cosmana Navarra
 Church dedicated to St Martin of Tours (Baħrija)
 Church of the Nativity of the Virgin Mary (Mtaħleb)
 Church of St. Catherine (Tad-Daħla)
 Church of the Immaculate Conception (Wied Gerżuma)
 Church of the Nativity of the Virgin Mary (Tas-Salib)
 Church of the Blessed Virgin (Dominican Order)
 Church of the Blessed Virgin (Franciscan Minors)
 Church of St. Francis (Conventual Franciscans)
Collegiate Basilica of St Paul
 Count Roger Band Club
 Dominican Priory
 Domus Romana
 Dwejra Lines
Fort Binġemma
 Għajn Għeriexem
 L’Isle Adam Band Club
 Loġġa tal-Palju
 Saint Nicholas College - (Primary School A and B)
 Santo Spirito Hospital - (National Archives of Malta)
 Sanctuary of Our Lady of Good Health
 St. Agatha’s Catacombs and Crypt
 St. Agatha's Church (Missionary Society of St Paul)
 St. Bartholomew's Church
 St. Catald's Church
 St. Luke Pastoral Centre - Nigret
 St. Mark's Church (Augustinians)
St. Paul's Catacombs
St. Paul's Missionary College
 St. Sebastian's Church
 Ta' Duna Church
 Museum Station
 Nicola Saura Hospital – Ospiza Saura 
 Niche of St. Paul in Saqqajja
Wignacourt Museum

Districts in Rabat

Baħrija
Bieb ir-Ruwa
Landrijiet
Għajn Qajjet
Għar Barka
Kunċizzjoni
Fomm ir-Riħ
Miġra Ferħa
Tas-Salvatur
Tas-Salib
Il-Lunzjata
Għemieri (Gomerino)
Għajn Klieb
Ħofra ta' Ritz
Il-Ħemsija
Misraħ Suffara
Mtaħleb
Nigret
Nigret tal-Ħarruba
Raba Nemel
Ras ir-Raħeb
Rdum tal-Lunzjata
Rdum tal-Vigarju
Ħal-Bajjada
Ta'Qasgha`
Ta' Busugrilla
Ta' Cassia
Ta' Fantin
Ta' Gerżuma
Ta' Lawrenti
Ta' Manduca
Ta' Namura
Ta' Sirena
Tal-Infetti
Tabja
Tal-Forok
Tal-Marġa
Tal-Virtù
Tat-Torri
Tax-Xieref
Ras ir-Raħeb
Santa Katarina (tad-Daħla)
Saqqajja
Wied Gerżuma
Wied il-Baħrija
Wied il-Bużbież
Wied il-Fiddien
Wied iż-Żebbuġ
Wied Liemu
Wied Rini
Wied tal-Isqof
Wied tal-Marġa
Xagħra tal-Isqof

Thoroughfares

Misraħ il-Parroċċa (Parish Square)
Misraħ San Duminku (Sant Dominic Square)
Pjazza tas-Saqqajja (Saqqajja Square)
Telgħa tas-Saqqajja (Saqqajja Hill)
Triq Ġorġ Borg Olivier (George Borg Olivier Road)
Triq Għajn Qajjet (Ghajn Qajjet Road)
Triq Għeriexem (Gheriexem Street)
Triq Ħad-Dingli (Dingli Road)
Triq Ħal Bajjada (Hal Bajjada Street)
Triq il-Buskett (Buskett Road)
Triq il-Kbira (Main Street)
Triq il-Kulleġġ (College Street)
Triq it-Tiġrija (Tigrija Street)
Triq Santa Rita (St Rita Street)
Triq tat-Tabija (Tabija Street)
Vjal il-Ħaddiem (Labour Avenue)

Band clubs and feasts
St. Paul, Conte Roger Band Club (Każin San Pawl Banda Konti Ruġġieru)
St. Joseph, L'Isle Adam Band Club A.D. 1860 (L-Għaqda Mużikali L'Isle Adam A.D. 1860) http://www.bandalisleadam.com/
Festa  Titulari tal-martirju ta’ San Pawl http://sanpawl.rabatmalta.com
Festa Sekondarja ta' San Gużepp http://sanguzepp.rabatmalta.com
Festa Prinċipali u Solenni ta' Corpus Domini
Festa tal-Madonna taċ-Ċintura http://www.rabatmalta.com/amcsaa
Festa ta' Santa Katarina tad-daħla
Festa ta' San Anton Abbati
Festa tal-Madonna tas-Saħħa
Festa tal-Immakulata Kunċizzjoni
Festa tat-Twelid ta-Marija - l-Imtaħleb
Festa ta' San Martin - Baħrija

Sport
Rabat has its own football club called Rabat Ajax F.C. Rabat won the Maltese Premier League twice (1984–85 Maltese Premier League and 1985–86 Maltese Premier League), and the Maltese Cup once in 1986.

Twin towns — sister cities

Rabat is twinned with:
 Tarquinia, Italy

References

External links

Rabat Local Council

 
Towns in Malta
Local councils of Malta
Phoenician colonies in Malta